Sembe is a town in Grand Cape Mount County, Liberia.

Populated places in Liberia
Grand Cape Mount County